Shooting competitions at the 2022 Bolivarian Games in Valledupar, Colombia are being held from 27 June to 3 July 2022 at Polígono Fedetiro Nilo in Nilo, a sub-venue outside Valledupar.

Fourteen medal events are scheduled to be contested, six for each men and women and two mixed gender events. A total of 95 athletes (56 men and 39 women) will compete in the events. The events were open competitions without age restrictions.

It was planned that a mixed skeet event would be held, but finally did not take place.

Guatemala were the shooting competitions defending champions after having won them in the previous edition in Santa Marta 2017. Guatemala and Peru won 4 gold medals each, however, Guatemala reached seven more silver medals (9–2) than Peru to win the shooting competitions again.

Participating nations
A total of 10 nations (all the 7 ODEBO nations and 3 invited) registered athletes for the shooting competitions. Each nation was able to enter up to 24 athletes (12 per gender), with a maximun of 2 athletes per singles events and a maximun of two teams per mixed events.

Venue
The shooting competitions were held at the Polígono Fedetiro Nilo, headquarters of the Federación Colombiana de Tiro y Caza, in Nilo, department of Cundinamarca.

Medal summary

Medal table

Medalists

Men's events

Women's events

Mixed events

References

External links
Bolivarianos Valledupar 2022 Shooting

2022 Bolivarian Games
Bolivarian Games
Shooting competitions in Colombia